Jason Pagan (born 20 April 1994) is a Cuban soccer player who plays as a midfielder for the National Premier Soccer League club Puerto Rico Bayamón.

Early life
After migrating to the United States from Cuba, Jason spent his youth career at 
various youth clubs around the city of Chicago. Many of which were indoor soccer as well as outdoor. 
He played for the Chicago fire youth academy.

Career

Puerto Rico Islanders
In January 2013, Jason signed a contract with Puerto Rico Islanders for the 2013 spring and fall seasons.

Puerto Rico BFC
With the Puerto Rico Islanders being suspended from play, Jason signed with Bayamon FC. Jason is in contention
to play with the Puerto Rican U-21 National squad. He will be playing with Bayamon FC in the upcoming season.

References

1994 births
Living people
Sportspeople from Santiago de Cuba
Association football midfielders
Cuban footballers
Puerto Rico Islanders players
Bayamón FC players
Cuban expatriate footballers
Expatriate footballers in Puerto Rico
Cuban expatriate sportspeople in Puerto Rico
National Premier Soccer League players